Elvis Bryson Kafoteka (born January 17, 1978 in Lilongwe) was a Malawian international footballer, in 2014 he retired from playing football

Career
Kafoteka began his career with CIVO United and signed in January 2008 for the Hong Kong Rangers FC. After a half year who earned 7 caps for Hong Kong Rangers FC returned to Malawi and signed with Super ESCOM. He played for Super ESCOM two years and joined in January 2010 to Rwandan club APR FC.

International career
Kafoteka was a member of the (Malawi national football team) and one of the best right backs Malawi has produced.

Notes

1978 births
Living people
People from Lilongwe
Malawian footballers
Malawi international footballers
2010 Africa Cup of Nations players
Association football defenders
Hong Kong Rangers FC players
Hong Kong First Division League players
Expatriate footballers in Hong Kong
Malawian expatriate footballers
Expatriate footballers in Rwanda
APR F.C. players
Civo United FC players
ESCOM United FC players